Alcyonium is a genus of soft corals in the family Alcyoniidae.

Species
Species in the genus include:
 Alcyonium acaule Marion, 1878
 Alcyonium adriaticum Kükenthal, 1909
 Alcyonium altum Tixier-Durivault, 1955
 Alcyonium antarcticum Wright & studer, 1889
 Alcyonium aspiculatum Tixier-Durivault, 1955
 Alcyonium aurantiacum Quoy & Gaimard, 1834
 Alcyonium bocagei (Saville Kent, 1870)
 Alcyonium bosphorense Tixier-Durivault, 1961
 Alcyonium brioniense Kükenthal, 1907
 Alcyonium burmedju Sampaio, Stokvis & Ofwegen, 2016
 Alcyonium bursa Linnaeus, 1758
 Alcyonium capitatum (Pfeffer, 1889)
 Alcyonium catalai Tixier-Durivault, 1970
 Alcyonium ceylonense May, 1899
 Alcyonium clavatum Studer, 1890
 Alcyonium compactofestucum Verseveldt & van Ofwegen, 1992
 Alcyonium confertum Boone, 1938
 Alcyonium coralloides (Pallas, 1766)
 Alcyonium cydonium Linnaeus, 1767 sensu Esper, 1829
 Alcyonium dendroides Thomson & Dean, 1931
 Alcyonium digitatum Linnaeus, 1758
 Alcyonium dolium McFadden & Ofwegen, 2017
 Alcyonium echinatum Tixier-Durivault, 1970
 Alcyonium elegans (Kukenthal, 1902)
 Alcyonium etheridgei Thomson & Mackinnon, 1911
 Alcyonium faura J. S. Thomson, 1910
 Alcyonium fauri Studer, 1910
 Alcyonium flabellum Quoy & Gaimard, 1834
 Alcyonium foliatum J. S. Thomson, 1921
 Alcyonium fulvum (Forskål, 1775)
 Alcyonium fungiforme Tixier Durivault, 1954
 Alcyonium glaciophilum van Ofwegen, Häussermann & Försterra, 2007
 Alcyonium glomeratum (Hassal, 1843)
 Alcyonium grandis Casas, Ramil & van Ofwegen, 1997
 Alcyonium graniferum Tixier-Durivault & d'Hondt, 1974
 Alcyonium haddoni Wright & Studer, 1889
 Alcyonium hibernicum (Renouf, 1931)
 Alcyonium jorgei van Ofwegen, Häussermann & Försterra, 2007
 Alcyonium luteum Tixier Durivault, 1954
 Alcyonium manusdiaboli Linnaeus, 1767
 Alcyonium maristenebrosi Stiasny, 1937
 Alcyonium megasclerum Stokvis & van Ofwegen, 2007
 Alcyonium muricatum Yamada, 1950
 Alcyonium pacificum Yamada, 1950
 Alcyonium palmatum Pallas, 1766
 Alcyonium patagonicum (May, 1899)
 Alcyonium paucilobulatum Casas, Ramil & van Ofwegen, 1997
 Alcyonium pobeguini Tixier-Durivault, 1955
 Alcyonium profundum Stokvis & van Ofwegen, 2007
 Alcyonium repens Stiasny, 1941
 Alcyonium reptans Kükenthal, 1906
 Alcyonium robustum Utinomi, 1976
 Alcyonium roseum van Ofwegen, Häussermann & Försterra, 2007
 Alcyonium rotiferum Thomson, 1910
 Alcyonium senegalense Verseveldt & van Ofwegen, 1992
 Alcyonium sidereum Verrill, 1922
 Alcyonium sollasi Wright & Studer, 1889
 Alcyonium southgeorgiensis Casas, Ramil & van Ofwegen, 1997
 Alcyonium spitzbergense Verseveldt & van Ofwegen, 1992
 Alcyonium submurale Ridley, 1883
 Alcyonium varum McFadden & van Ofwegen, 2013
 Alcyonium verseveldti Benayahu, 1982
 Alcyonium yepayek van Ofwegen, Häussermann & Försterra, 2007

References

Alcyoniidae
Octocorallia genera